Carolina Commando was a light infantry regiment of the South African Army. It formed part of the South African Army Infantry Formation as well as the South African Territorial Reserve.

History

Origin
Previously a part of the Lydenburg Commando, Carolina Commando was formed around 1859.

Operations

With the Zuid Afrikaanse Republiek
This commandos first engagements included;
 Opposing the Jameson Raid in 1896. 
 The war against the Mphephu (1897–98).

The commando was involved in the following engagements in the Anglo Boer War:
 
 The Battle of Modderspruit 30 October 1899.
 The Battle of Platrand 6 January 1900, the Carolina Commando attacked Ladysmith to prevent reinforcements from being sent to Platrand.
 The Battle of Spioenkop where the Commando formed part of the reserve.
 The Carolina and Lydenburg commandos defended Botha's Pass on 6 June 1900.
 The battle of Bergendal, August 1900.
 The remaining members laid down the arms at Twyfelaar in June 1902.

With the UDF
By 1902 all Commando remnants were under British military control and disarmed.

By 1912, however previous Commando members could join shooting associations.

By 1940, such commandos were under control of the National Reserve of Volunteers.

These commandos were formally reactivated by 1948.

With the SADF
Under the SADF, this Commando was seconded to Group 28's Command. It was utilised in  the area protection role.

With the SANDF
Under the SANDF's Group 12 situated in Ermelo made use of the commandos at Carolina, Ermelo and Piet Retief for some borderline functions.

Disbandment
This unit, along with all other Commando units was disbanded after a decision by South African President Thabo Mbeki to disband all Commando Units. The Commando system was phased out between 2003 and 2008 "because of the role it played in the apartheid era", according to the Minister of Safety and Security Charles Nqakula.

Unit Insignia

Leadership

References

See also 
 South African Commando System

Infantry regiments of South Africa
South African Commando Units
Military units and formations of the Second Boer War